The Conspicuous Service Medal (CSM) is a military decoration awarded to personnel of the Australian Defence Force, and officers and instructors of the Australian Defence Force Cadets. It is awarded for meritorious achievement or dedication to duty in non-war like situations. The CSM was introduced in 1989 and is a distinct Australian military award. It is the second level award of the Conspicuous Service Decorations in the Australian Honours System. Recipients of the Conspicuous Service Medal are entitled to use the post-nominal letters "CSM". Since its inception 1,021 had been awarded, plus a single Bar. All ranks are eligible for the award.

Description
 The Conspicuous Service Medal is a circular nickel-silver medal 38 mm in diameter. It is ensigned with the Crown of Saint Edward in nickel-silver. The obverse bears the Southern Cross surrounded by a laurel wreath. 
 The reverse has a horizontal panel that is superimposed on a design of fluted rays. 
 The medal is suspended from the ribbon by a nickel-silver suspension bar. 
 The 32 mm ribbon has alternating equal-width, diagonal stripes of bush green and sandy gold.

See also
Australian Honours Order of Precedence

References

External links
It's an Honour Australian Government website

Military awards and decorations of Australia

1989 establishments in Australia
Awards established in 1989